The 2020 Morehead State Eagles football team represented Morehead State University in the 2020–21 NCAA Division I FCS football season. They were led by eighth-year head coach Rob Tenyer and play their home games at Jayne Stadium. They competed as members of the Pioneer Football League.

Previous season

The Eagles finished the 2019 season 5–7, 3–5 in PFL play to finish in seventh place.

Schedule

References

Morehead State
Morehead State Eagles football seasons
Morehead State Eagles football